Throughout the history of the National Hockey League (NHL), there has been a long-standing tradition of international games played by NHL teams. The following is a list of games played by NHL teams against other NHL teams and non-NHL teams outside the United States and Canada, as well games played by NHL teams in the United States and Canada against non-North American teams. The NHL began playing games around the globe, with 30 teams traveling to 15 countries across Europe and Asia since the Montreal Canadiens and Detroit Red Wings first went to Europe for a postseason exhibition tour in 1938. The game played on 21 April 1938 was the first one organized by any Major professional sports leagues in the United States and Canada, to take place outside North America. In the tables below bolded team names denote winners.

Europe

1938 Detroit Red Wings–Montreal Canadiens European tour

In 1938, for the first time in NHL history two of the league's teams, the Detroit Red Wings and the Montreal Canadiens, went on a tour of Europe with a nine-game series in England and France. The Canadiens won the series with a record of 5–3–1.

1959 Boston Bruins–New York Rangers European tour
In 1959, the Boston Bruins and the New York Rangers (aided by Bobby Hull, Ed Litzenberger, Eric Nesterenko, and Pierre Pilote of the Chicago Black Hawks) went on a 23-game tour of Europe, visiting England, Switzerland, France, Belgium, West Germany, and Austria. The Rangers won the series with a record of 11–9–3.

The first game in Geneva was attended by a sell-out crowd of 11,000, the attendance for the Zürich games was 4500 and 2000. In Berlin, only 600 people went to see the first game.

1975–76 Super Series

In late 1975 and early 1976, two Soviet League teams from Moscow, USSR (CSKA, also known as "Red Army", and Krylya Sovetov, also known as "Soviet Wings") played an eight-game series against several NHL teams (the Chicago Black Hawks, the Boston Bruins, the Buffalo Sabres, the Montreal Canadiens, the New York Islanders, the New York Rangers, the Philadelphia Flyers, and the Pittsburgh Penguins). The games took place in the US and Canada. The Soviet teams won the series with a record of 5–2–1. Individually, CSKA had a record of 2–1–1 and Krylya Sovetov had a record of 3–1–0.

1977–78 Czechoslovak NHL tour and Super Series

In late 1977 and early 1978, two Czechoslovakian teams (TJ Poldi SONP Kladno and Tesla Pardubice) along with one Soviet team (Spartak Moscow) went on a 13-game tour of the NHL, playing against several NHL teams (the Atlanta Flames, the Chicago Black Hawks, the Cleveland Barons, the Colorado Rockies, the Detroit Red Wings, the Minnesota North Stars, the Montreal Canadiens, the New York Islanders, the New York Rangers, the Philadelphia Flyers, the St. Louis Blues, the Toronto Maple Leafs, and the Vancouver Canucks). Games took place in the US and Canada. Both sides finished the series with 6–6–1 records. Individually, Kladno had a record of 2–1–1, Pardubice had a record of 1–3–0 (combined Czech record of 3–4–1), and Spartak had a record of 3–2–0.

1978–79 Super Series

In late 1978 and early 1979, Soviet Union's Krylya Sovetov from Moscow played a four-game series against NHL teams (the Boston Bruins, the Detroit Red Wings, the Minnesota North Stars, and the Philadelphia Flyers). Games took place in the United States. Krylya Sovetov won the series with a 2–1–1 record.

1979 Challenge Cup

The 1979 Challenge Cup was a series of international ice hockey games between the Soviet Union national ice hockey team and a team of All-Stars from the National Hockey League. The games were played on February 8, 10, and 11 at Madison Square Garden in New York City. It replaced the NHL's all-star festivities for the 1978–79 NHL season. The Soviets defeated the NHL All-Stars 2 games to 1.

1979–80 Super Series

In late 1979 and early 1980, two Soviet teams from Moscow, CSKA and Dynamo, played a nine-game series against several NHL teams (the Buffalo Sabres, the Edmonton Oilers, the Montreal Canadiens, the New York Islanders, the New York Rangers, the Quebec Nordiques, the Vancouver Canucks, the Washington Capitals, and the original Winnipeg Jets). Games took place in the US and Canada. The Moscow teams won the series with a record of 5–3–1. Individually, CSKA had a record of 3–2–0, and Dynamo had a record of 2–1–1.

1980 DN-Cup
In 1980, the Minnesota North Stars and the Washington Capitals participated in the DN-Cup, a round-robin tournament in Sweden sponsored by the newspaper Dagens Nyheter, with Swedish teams AIK and Djurgården from Stockholm. Six games were played in total, five involving the NHL teams (AIK beat Djurgården 1–0 on September 21, attendance: 2,668). Washington won the tournament with a 3–0–0 record, Minnesota finished second with 2–1–0, AIK finished third and Djurgården last.

1981 DN-Cup
In 1981, the New York Rangers and the Washington Capitals participated in the round-robin DN-Cup in Sweden with Swedish teams Västra Frölunda, AIK, and Djurgården. The New York won the tournament with a 4–0–0 record, ahead of AIK, Västra Frölunda, Washington (1–3–0) and Djurgården. The list of DN-Cup games excludes three games played without NHL participation.

Each NHL team played an additional game in Finland, against HIFK and Oulun Kärpät. In total, the NHL teams posted a record of 5–3–0 against the European teams, New York finished 3–1–0, Washington 2–2–0 (excluding the NHL-only game).

DN-Cup

Other games

1982–83 Super Series

In late 1982 and early 1983, the USSR national team played a six-game series against several NHL teams (the Calgary Flames, the Edmonton Oilers, the Minnesota North Stars, the Montreal Canadiens, the Philadelphia Flyers, and the Quebec Nordiques). Games took place in the US and Canada. The USSR team won the series with a 4–2–0 record.

1985–86 Super Series

In late 1985 and early 1986, two Soviet teams from Moscow, CSKA and Dynamo, played a ten-game series against several NHL teams (the Boston Bruins, the Buffalo Sabres, the Calgary Flames, the Edmonton Oilers, the Los Angeles Kings, the Minnesota North Stars, the Montreal Canadiens, the Pittsburgh Penguins, the Quebec Nordiques, and the St. Louis Blues). Games took place in the US and Canada. The Moscow teams won the series with a record of 7–2–1. Individually, CSKA had a record of 5–1–0 and Dynamo had a record of 2–1–1.

Rendez-vous '87

Rendez-vous '87 was a series of international ice hockey games between the Soviet Union national ice hockey team and a team of All-Stars from the National Hockey League. The games were played on February 11 and 13 at Le Colisée in Quebec City. It replaced the NHL's all-star festivities for the 1986–87 NHL season. Both teams won one of the two games, with the Soviets winning overall on total score, 8–7.

1988–89 Super Series

In late 1988 and early 1989 two Soviet League teams, CSKA Moscow and Dinamo Riga, played a 14-games series against several NHL teams (the Boston Bruins, the Buffalo Sabres, the Calgary Flames, the Chicago Blackhawks, the Edmonton Oilers, the Hartford Whalers, the Los Angeles Kings, the Minnesota North Stars, the New Jersey Devils, the New York Islanders, the Pittsburgh Penguins, the Quebec Nordiques, the St. Louis Blues, and the Vancouver Canucks). Games took place in the US and Canada. Both sides finished with a record of 6–6–2. Individually, CSKA had a record of 4–2–1 and Dinamo had a record of 2–4–1.

1989 Friendship Tour
In 1989, the Calgary Flames and the Washington Capitals went on a twelve-game European tour, playing against teams from Sweden (Färjestad BK and Brynäs IF) and the USSR (CSKA Moscow, Dynamo Moscow, Dinamo Riga, Khimik Voskresensk, Krylya Sovetov Moscow, SKA Leningrad, Sokol Kiev, and Spartak Moscow). The Flames preceded these games with a two-game series in Czechoslovakia against the Czechoslovakia national team, losing both. The NHL teams won the series with a record of 7–5–0 (0–2–0 against Czechoslovakia, 1–1–0 against the Swedish teams, and 6–2–0 against Soviet teams). Individually, Calgary had a record of 3–3–0 and Washington had a record of 4–2–0.

1989–90 Super Series

In late 1989 and early 1990 a record four Soviet teams (CSKA Moscow, Dynamo Moscow, Khimik Voskresensk, and Krylya Sovetov Moscow went on a 21-game tour of North America, playing against every NHL team (the Boston Bruins, the Buffalo Sabres, the Calgary Flames, the Chicago Blackhawks, the Detroit Red Wings, the Edmonton Oilers, the Hartford Whalers, the Los Angeles Kings, the Minnesota North Stars, the Montreal Canadiens, the New Jersey Devils, the New York Islanders, the New York Rangers, the Philadelphia Flyers, the Pittsburgh Penguins, the Quebec Nordiques, the St. Louis Blues, the Toronto Maple Leafs, the Vancouver Canucks, the Washington Capitals, and the original Winnipeg Jets). Games took place in the US and Canada. The Soviet teams won the series with a record of 11–9–1. Individually, CSKA had a record of 4–1–0, Dynamo had a record of 3–2–0, Khimik had a record of 3–3–0, and Krylya Sovetov had a record of 1–3–1.

1990 Edmonton Oilers–St. Louis Blues European tournament
In 1990, the Edmonton Oilers and the St. Louis Blues participated in the Epson Cup played in Düsseldorf with hosts Düsseldorfer EG. The Oilers then played two more games against EC Graz of Austria, and EC Hedos Munich of Germany. The NHL teams posted a record of 4–0–0, excluding the NHL-only game.

1990 Friendship Tour
In 1990, the Minnesota North Stars and the Montreal Canadiens went on a nine-game tour of Europe, dubbed the Friendship Tour '90, with a game in Sweden against AIK, and the rest in the USSR against CSKA Moscow, Dynamo Moscow, Khimik Voskresensk, Krylya Sovetov Moscow, a SKA Leningrad/Torpedo Yaroslavl joint squad, Sokol Kiev, Spartak Moscow, and Latvian (the country declared its independence from the USSR on 4 May) team Dinamo Riga. The European teams won the series with a record of 5–4–0. Individually, the Canadiens had a record of 3–2–0 and the North Stars had a record of 1–3–0.

For the game in Sweden, the NHL had required the Canadiens to wear generic orange jerseys with the NHL shield, but backed off when the organisation was uncooperative.

1990–91 Super Series

In late 1990 and early 1991 three Soviet teams (CSKA Moscow, Dynamo Moscow, Khimik Voskresensk) went on a 21-game tour of North America, playing against every NHL team (the Boston Bruins, the Buffalo Sabres, the Calgary Flames, the Chicago Blackhawks, the Detroit Red Wings, the Edmonton Oilers, the Hartford Whalers, the Los Angeles Kings, the Minnesota North Stars, the Montreal Canadiens, the New Jersey Devils, the New York Islanders, the New York Rangers, the Philadelphia Flyers, the Pittsburgh Penguins, the Quebec Nordiques, the St. Louis Blues, the Toronto Maple Leafs, the Vancouver Canucks, the Washington Capitals, and the original Winnipeg Jets). Games took place in the US and Canada. The Soviet teams won the series with a record of 12–6–3. Individually, CSKA had a record of 6–1–0, Dynamo had a record of 3–2–2, and Khimik had a record of 3–3–1.

1992 Chicago Blackhawks–Montreal Canadiens English games
In 1992, the Chicago Blackhawks and the Montreal Canadiens played a two-game series in England. Each team won one game.

1993 New York Rangers–Toronto Maple Leafs English games
In 1993, the New York Rangers and the Toronto Maple Leafs played a two-game series in England. The Rangers won both games.

1994 NHL International Challenge in Finland, with the Winnipeg Jets
In 1994, the original Winnipeg Jets played in a four-team compressed tournament with HIFK Helsinki, Helsinki Jokerit, and Tappara Tampere in Finland. The Jets won their first game against Tappara, and then HIFK in the final. The tournament had been set up for a final game between Teemu Selänne's old team (Jokerit) and current team (the Jets).

Ninety Nine All Stars Tour

During the 1994–95 NHL lockout, Wayne Gretzky formed a team called the Ninety Nine All Stars to play a tour of exhibition games across Europe against various European club teams, in order to stay in game shape and raise money for charity.

 December 1, 1994: 3–4 loss vs Detroit Vipers (IHL)
 December 3, 1994: 7–1 win vs Jokerit (Finland)
 December 4, 1994: 3–4 OT loss vs Ilves Tampere (Finland)
 December 6, 1994: 6–3 win vs Norwegian Spectrum All Stars (Norway)
 December 9, 1994: 8–3 win vs Djurgårdens IF (Sweden)
 December 10, 1994: 5–2 win vs Västra Frölunda HC (Sweden)
 December 12, 1994: 5–6 OT loss vs Malmö IF (Sweden)
 December 14, 1994: 8–5 win vs German All Stars in Freiburg (Germany)

1998 Buffalo Sabres–Tampa Bay Lightning Austrian tournament
In 1998, the Buffalo Sabres and the Tampa Bay Lightning played in a three-game tournament in Austria against the Austrian teams KAC Klagenfurt and VEU Feldkirch. The NHL teams won the tournament with a record of 2–0–0, excluding the NHL-only game.

2000 NHL Challenge

In 2000, the Vancouver Canucks played a two-game series in Sweden against the Swedish teams Djurgården Stockholm and MoDo Örnsköldsvik. The Canucks won both games.

2001 NHL Challenge

In 2001, the Colorado Avalanche played a single game in Sweden against the Swedish team Brynäs Gävle. The Avalanche won. Two more games were scheduled (against Djurgarden and Jokerit), but the tour was cut short due to the September 11 attacks.

2003 NHL Challenge

In 2003, the Toronto Maple Leafs played a three-game series in Finland and Sweden against the Finnish team Jokerit Helsinki and the Swedish teams Djurgården Stockholm and Färjestad Karlstad. The Maple Leafs won all games.

2004–05 season NHL Worldstars
During the 2004–2005 NHL labour dispute, the NHL Worldstars team played.

2007 NHL Premiere

In 2007, the NHL opened its regular season in Europe for the first time. The Anaheim Ducks and the Los Angeles Kings played a two-game series in England. Each team won one game. Prior to this, the Kings played a two-game series in Austria against the Austrian team Red Bull Salzburg and the Swedish team Färjestad Karlstad, winning both.

2008 NHL Premiere

In 2008, four teams from the NHL (the New York Rangers, the Ottawa Senators, the Pittsburgh Penguins, and the Tampa Bay Lightning) opened their regular seasons in Europe. The Rangers and the Lightning played a two-game series in the Czech Republic, with the Rangers winning both games. The Senators and the Penguins played a two-game series in Sweden, with each team winning one game. Prior to this, the Rangers played in the inaugural Victoria Cup against Metallurg Magnitogorsk from Russia. All four teams also played against various European teams (Eisbären Berlin from Germany, SC Bern from Switzerland, Slovan Bratislava from Slovakia, Jokerit Helsinki from Finland, and Frölunda Gothenburg from Sweden). The NHL teams won all games.

2009 NHL Premiere

In 2009, once more four teams from the NHL (the Chicago Blackhawks, the Detroit Red Wings, the Florida Panthers, and the St. Louis Blues) opened their regular seasons in Europe. The Blackhawks and the Panthers played a two-game series in Finland, with each team winning once. The Red Wings and the Blues played a two-game series in Sweden, with the Blues winning both games. Prior to this, the Blackhawks played in the second annual Victoria Cup against ZSC Lions from Switzerland. All four teams also played against various European teams (Jokerit Helsinki and Tappara Tampere from Finland, HC Davos from Switzerland, and Färjestad BK and Linköpings HC from Sweden). The NHL teams had a record of 4–2–0 against the European teams.

2010 NHL Premiere

In 2010, a record six NHL teams (the Boston Bruins, the Carolina Hurricanes, the Columbus Blue Jackets, the Minnesota Wild, the Phoenix Coyotes, and the San Jose Sharks) opened their regular seasons in Europe. The Hurricanes and the Wild played a two-game series in Finland, with the Hurricanes winning both games. The Blue Jackets and the Sharks played a two-game series in Sweden, with each team winning one game. The Bruins and the Coyotes played a two-game series in the Czech Republic, with each team winning one game. Prior to this, all six teams also played against various European teams (Adler Mannheim from Germany, Belfast Giants Selects from Northern Ireland (an all-star team  of the EIHL), SKA Saint Petersburg from Russia, Ilves Tampere from Finland, HC Bílí Tygři Liberec from the Czech Republic, Malmö Redhawks from Sweden, and Dinamo Riga from Latvia). The NHL teams had a record of 6–1–0 against the European teams.

2011 NHL Premiere

In 2011, four teams from the NHL (the Anaheim Ducks, the Buffalo Sabres, the Los Angeles Kings, and the New York Rangers) opened their regular seasons in Europe, marking the fifth straight season of the NHL Premiere games. On October 7, the Ducks and the Sabres played a game in Finland, while the Kings and the Rangers played a game in Sweden. The next day, the Ducks and the Rangers played a game in Sweden, while the Sabres and the Kings played a game in Germany. These teams also played exhibition games against HC Sparta Prague from the Czech Republic, Frölunda HC from Sweden, Slovan Bratislava from Slovakia, EV Zug from Switzerland, Jokerit Helsinki from Finland and Adler Mannheim and Hamburg Freezers from Germany as part of their pre-season schedule. The New York Rangers, playing four games in five days in four countries, had a record of 3–1–0 against the European teams. The NHL teams had an overall record of 6–1–0 against the European teams.

In March 2012, the NHL announced that it would not schedule an NHL Premiere event for 2012.

2017 NHL Global Series
On March 24, 2017, the NHL announced the return of regular season games played outside North America in a new event called the NHL Global Series. The Colorado Avalanche and Ottawa Senators played two regular season games at the Ericsson Globe in Stockholm, Sweden on November 10 and 11, 2017. Unlike the previous regular-season series played in Europe by the NHL, these games were played a month into the regular season rather than the start of it.

2018 NHL Global Series
On March 26, 2018, the NHL announced the 2018 slate of NHL Global Series games. The New Jersey Devils and Edmonton Oilers played their regular season opening game in Sweden on October 6, preceded by two exhibition games against European teams. The Florida Panthers and Winnipeg Jets then played two regular season games in Finland on November 1 and 2.

2019 NHL Global Series
On March 21, 2019, the NHL announced the 2019 lineup of hockey games in Europe. The Chicago Blackhawks and Philadelphia Flyers played their regular season opening game in Prague on October 4, preceded by two exhibition games against European teams. The Blackhawks played Eisbären Berlin on September 29 in Berlin and the Flyers played Lausanne HC in Lausanne on September 30. The Buffalo Sabres and Tampa Bay Lightning then played two regular season games in Sweden on November 8 and 9.

2022 NHL Global Series
After a two-year hiatus, the Global Series returned for 2022. The slate of games was revealed on April 22.

The Nashville Predators and San Jose Sharks will begin the 2022–23 season with two games in Prague. Ahead of such games, both teams will have preseason games against SC Bern and Eisbären Berlin. The Columbus Blue Jackets and Colorado Avalanche have games in Tampere.

Japan

1976 Kansas City Scouts–Washington Capitals Japanese tour
In 1976, the Kansas City Scouts and the Washington Capitals played a four-game series in Japan. The Capitals won the series with a 3–1–0 record.

1997 Mighty Ducks of Anaheim–Vancouver Canucks Japanese games
In 1997, the Mighty Ducks of Anaheim and the Vancouver Canucks played a two-game series in Japan to open the 1997–98 regular season. This marked the first time that games played by NHL teams outside of North America counted in the league standings. Each team won one game.

1998 Calgary Flames–San Jose Sharks Japanese games
In 1998, the Calgary Flames and the San Jose Sharks played a two-game series in Japan. The teams tied one game, and the Flames won the other. These games counted in the regular-season standings.

2000 Nashville Predators–Pittsburgh Penguins Japanese games
In 2000, the Nashville Predators and the Pittsburgh Penguins played a two-game series in Japan. Each team won one game. As with the previous season-opening series in Japan in 1997 and 1998, these games counted in the regular-season standings.

China

2017 NHL China Games

On March 29, 2017, the NHL announced that the Los Angeles Kings and Vancouver Canucks would play two exhibition games in China in a new event called the NHL China Games. Both teams faced each other in Shanghai, on September 21, 2017, and then in Beijing, on September 23. This was the first time NHL teams played in China.

2018 NHL China Games
On May 2, 2018, the NHL announced that the Boston Bruins and Calgary Flames would play two exhibition games in China for the second consecutive year. Both teams faced each other in Shenzhen on September 15, and then in Beijing on September 19.

Puerto Rico

2006 Florida Panthers–New York Rangers Puerto Rican game
In 2006, as part of the pre-season for the 2006–07 NHL season, the Florida Panthers and the New York Rangers played an exhibition game at the Coliseo de Puerto Rico, San Juan, Puerto Rico. The Rangers won the game.

See also
 List of KHL vs NHL games
 List of international ice hockey competitions featuring NHL players
 Gardiner Cup

References

External links
 NHL overseas history at NHL.com
 List of international NHL games at IIHF.com
 NHL overseas history at GreatestHockeyLegends.com
 Slapshots list of NHL vs. European games
 1959 tour at NHL.com
 2006 game in Puerto Rico
 2010 NHL Premiere

International
International